Anne Anituatua Delamere  (15 May 1921 – 26 May 2006) was a New Zealand public servant.

Born in Rotorua on 15 May 1921, Delamere was of Māori descent, affiliating to Te Whānau-ā-Apanui and Te Arawa. She was educated at Queen Victoria School in Auckland, and saw military service in the New Zealand Women's Auxiliary Air Force between 1942 and 1947. She was based at Defence Headquarters in Wellington, working in the team that coordinated the Māori war effort.

In 1950, Delamere was recruited as a welfare officer by the Department of Maori Affairs and initially worked in Whakatane. She was closely involved in the foundation of the Māori Women's Welfare League in 1951. She was awarded a tertiary scholarship and studied at Victoria University of Wellington from 1958 to 1959, where she completed a Diploma of Social Science.

After completing her diploma, Delamere remained in Wellington at the Department of Maori Affairs. In 1961, she was involved in the establishment of the Māori Education Foundation, and she was also involved with liaising between Maori Affairs and a wide range of government and community groups. She rose to become a senior executive officer in the Department of Maori Affairs.

In the 1985 Queen's Birthday Honours, Delamere was appointed a Companion of the Queen's Service Order for community service. In the 2004 New Year Honours, she was appointed a Distinguished Companion of the New Zealand Order of Merit, for services to Māori. She was also conferred life membership of the Māori Women's Welfare League.

Delamere died in Wellington on 26 May 2006.

References

1921 births
2006 deaths
People from Rotorua
Te Whānau-ā-Apanui people
Te Arawa people
New Zealand military personnel of World War II
New Zealand public servants
Victoria University of Wellington alumni
Companions of the Queen's Service Order
Distinguished Companions of the New Zealand Order of Merit
People of the Māori Women's Welfare League